Braxton Russell Lee (born August 23, 1993) is an American professional baseball outfielder and hitting coach for the Southern Maryland Blue Crabs of the Atlantic League of Professional Baseball. He played in Major League Baseball (MLB) for the Miami Marlins in 2018.

Career

Tampa Bay Rays
Lee attended Picayune High School in Picayune, Mississippi and played college baseball at Pearl River Community College and the University of Mississippi. He was drafted by the Tampa Bay Rays in the 12th round of the 2014 Major League Baseball Draft. He spent his first professional season with the Hudson Valley Renegades and batted .287 with 13 RBIs and 12 stolen bases in 51 games. He played for the Charlotte Stone Crabs in 2015 and posted a .281 batting average with 24 RBIs in 115 games, and for the Montgomery Biscuits in 2016 where he slashed .209/.269/256 with 25 RBIs in 110 games.

Miami Marlins
Lee started 2017 with the Montgomery Biscuits. On June 26, he was traded, along with Ethan Clark, to the Miami Marlins for Adeiny Hechavarria. The Marlins assigned him to the Jacksonville Jumbo Shrimp where he spent the rest of the season. In 127 combined games between Montgomery and Jacksonville, he batted .309 with three home runs, 37 RBIs and twenty stolen bases. After the season, Lee played in the Arizona Fall League and was selected to play in the Fall Stars Game. The Marlins added him to their 40-man roster after the season.

The Marlins added Lee to their 2018 Opening Day 25-man roster. Lee went 3-for-17 in 8 major league games in 2018. On November 20, 2018, Lee was designated for assignment by Miami.

New York Mets
At the 2018 Winter Meetings, the New York Mets selected Lee from the Marlins in the minor league phase of the Rule 5 draft. Lee spent the 2019 season between the Binghamton Rumble Ponies and the Syracuse Mets. Lee did not play in a game in 2020 due to the cancellation of the minor league season because of the COVID-19 pandemic. He became a free agent on November 2, 2020.

Southern Maryland Blue Crabs
On April 8, 2021, Lee signed with the Southern Maryland Blue Crabs of the Atlantic League of Professional Baseball. Lee went 7-for-16 with 1 home run in 4 games for the Blue Crabs.

Cincinnati Reds
On June 3, 2021, Lee's contract was purchased by the Cincinnati Reds organization.

Southern Maryland Blue Crabs (second stint)
On April 1, 2022, Lee signed a contract to return to the Southern Maryland Blue Crabs of the Atlantic League of Professional Baseball for the 2022 season.

On August 9, in a 7-3 victory against the High Point Rockers, Lee set the Atlantic League record for triples in a game, tallying three three-baggers in the game.

On January 27, 2023, Lee re-signed with the Blue Crabs as a player-coach, assuming the role of hitting coach for the 2023 season.

See also
Rule 5 draft results

References

External links

Ole Miss Rebels bio

1993 births
Living people
People from Picayune, Mississippi
Baseball players from Mississippi
Major League Baseball outfielders
Miami Marlins players
Pearl River Wildcats baseball players
Ole Miss Rebels baseball players
Hudson Valley Renegades players
Charlotte Stone Crabs players
Montgomery Biscuits players
Jacksonville Jumbo Shrimp players
Salt River Rafters players
New Orleans Baby Cakes players
Binghamton Rumble Ponies players
Syracuse Mets players
Southern Maryland Blue Crabs players